Peltula is a genus of small dark brown to olive or dark gray squamulose lichens that can be saxicolous (grow on rock)) or terricolous (grow on soil). Members of the genus are commonly called rock-olive lichens. They are cyanolichens, with the cyanobacterium photobiont from the genus Anacystis. They are umbilicate with flat to erect squamule lobes that attach from a central holdfast or cluster of rhizenes. Lichen spot tests are usually negative.

The thallus of members of the genus are similar to members of Heppia, Psora, and Placidium, although the first genus has cyanobacteria from the genus Scytonema, and the latter two genera have green algae as the photobiont.

The genus is in the family Peltulaceae.

Species
Peltula auriculata 
Peltula bolanderi 
Peltula brasiliensis 
Peltula capensis 
Peltula cataractae 
Peltula clavata 
Peltula cylindrica 
Peltula daurica 
Peltula euploca 
Peltula hassei 
Peltula imbricata 
Peltula impressa 
Peltula inversa 
Peltula leptophylla 
Peltula lobata  – Europe
Peltula lobulata  – China
Peltula obscurans 
Peltula obscuratula 
Peltula olifera 
Peltula omphaliza 
Peltula patellata 
Peltula placodizans 
Peltula polycarpa  – China
Peltula polyphylla  – China
Peltula pseudoboletiformis  – China
Peltula radicata 
Peltula rodriguesii 
Peltula steppae 
Peltula submarginata  – China
Peltula zahlbruckneri

References

Lichinomycetes
Ascomycota genera
Lichen genera
Taxa named by William Nylander (botanist)